The fixed-point lemma for normal functions is a basic result in axiomatic set theory stating that any normal function has arbitrarily large fixed points (Levy 1979: p. 117). It was first proved by Oswald Veblen in 1908.

Background and formal statement 
A normal function is a class function  from the class Ord of ordinal numbers to itself such that:
  is strictly increasing:  whenever .
  is continuous: for every limit ordinal  (i.e.  is neither zero nor a successor), .
It can be shown that if  is normal then  commutes with suprema; for any nonempty set  of ordinals,
.

A fixed point of a normal function is an ordinal  such that .

The continuity of the normal function implies the class of fixed points is closed (the supremum of any subset of the class of fixed points is again a fixed point). Thus the fixed point lemma is equivalent to the statement that the fixed points of a normal function form a closed and unbounded class.

Proof 
The first step of the proof is to verify that  for all ordinals  and that  commutes with suprema. Let , so . Moreover, because  commutes with suprema,  

The last equality follows from the fact that the sequence  increases.  

Example application 
The function f : Ord → Ord, f(α) = ωα is normal (see initial ordinal). Thus, there exists an ordinal θ such that θ = ωθ. In fact, the lemma shows that there is a closed, unbounded class of such θ.

References
 

Ordinal numbers
Normal Functions
Lemmas in set theory
Articles containing proofs